Krzysztof Jan Mehlich (born 2 August 1974 in Strzelce Opolskie) is a retired Polish athlete who specialised in the sprint hurdles. He represented his country at the 1996 Summer Olympics, reaching the semifinals, as well as two indoor World Championships. In addition, he won the bronze medal at the 1995 Summer Universiade.

He has personal bests of 13.40 seconds outdoors (Tallinn 1996) and 7.60 seconds indoors (Spała 1999).
 
His older brother, Ronald, is also a former hurdler.

Competition record

References

1974 births
Living people
Polish male hurdlers
Athletes (track and field) at the 1996 Summer Olympics
Olympic athletes of Poland
People from Strzelce Opolskie
Universiade medalists in athletics (track and field)
Universiade bronze medalists for Poland
Medalists at the 1995 Summer Universiade
20th-century Polish people